Kiyevka is a rural locality (a khutor) in Talovskoye Rural Settlement, Yelansky District, Volgograd Oblast, Russia. The population was 21 as of 2010. There is 1 street.

Geography 
Kiyevka is located on Khopyorsko-Buzulukskaya Plain, 9 km south of Yelan (the district's administrative centre) by road. Tersa is the nearest rural locality.

References 

Rural localities in Yelansky District